The 1955–56 season was Real Madrid Club de Fútbol's 53rd season in existence and the club's 25th consecutive season in the top flight of Spanish football.

Summary
The season is best remembered thanks to the first ever European Cup won, defeating Raymond Kopa and Just Fontaine's Stade de Reims in an exciting Final with a 4–3 score.

The team reached the semi-finals of the Copa del Generalísimo (losing to Athletic Bilbao 3–4 on aggregate without Di Stéfano) and finished third in the league 10 points behind champions Bilbao with a record 81 goals scored.

Squad

Transfers

Competitions

La Liga

League table

Position by round

Matches

Copa del Generalísimo

Round of 16

Quarter-finals

Semi-finals

European Cup

Round of 16

Quarter-finals

Semi-finals

Final

Statistics

Squad statistics

Players statistics

References

Real Madrid CF seasons
Real Madrid CF
UEFA Champions League-winning seasons